Kathu is a Lolo-Burmese language of Balong (坝聋), Nanping Township (南屏镇), Guangnan County, Yunnan, China. The Kathu are locally known as the White Yi (白彝). Wu Zili (2004) estimates that Kathu has a total of more than 7,000 speakers in Guangnan County (including in Dayashao 大牙少), as well as in Jinping County, Yunnan. Ethnologue mentions a possible presence in Guangxi Province.

A related variety is known as Thou.

Kathu-Thou is notable for having initial consonant clusters, which within the Lolo-Burmese branch are also found in Written Burmese (Old Burmese) and Jinuo (Hsiu 2014:66). Wu (2004) lists the onset clusters pl, pʰl, bl, ml, kl, kʰl, gl, ql, qʰl, ɢl, ŋl.

Varieties
Hsiu (2014:65) identifies two varieties, both spoken in Nanping Township (南屏镇).

Kathu, spoken in Anwang village 安王村
Thou, spoken in Balong village 坝聋村

Classification
Kathu vocabulary is largely similar to those of other Mondzish languages. However, there are various words that do not appear to be of Lolo-Burmese origin, and are derived from an unknown Tibeto-Burman branch (Hsiu 2014). Hsiu (2014) suggests that Kathu could be added to George van Driem's list of Trans-Himalayan "fallen leaves."

Bradley (1997) classified Kathu as a Northern Loloish language, while Bradley (2007) classified it as a Southeastern Loloish language. However, Pelkey (2011:458) notes that Kathu and Mo'ang are not Southeastern Loloish languages.

See also
Kathu word list (Wiktionary)

References

Wu Zili [武自立]. 2004. "Gasu language [嘎僳话]". In Studies on selected languages of Yunnan [云南特殊语言研究], 486-513. Kunming: Yunnan People's Press [云南民族出版社].

Further reading
Hsiu, Andrew. 2014. "Mondzish: a new subgroup of Lolo-Burmese". In Proceedings of the 14th International Symposium on Chinese Languages and Linguistics (IsCLL-14). Taipei: Academia Sinica.
Wu Zili [武自立]. 1994. A preliminary study of the Gasu language of Guangnan County, Yunnan Province [云南省广南县嘎苏话初探]. Minzu Yuwen 2. http://wuxizazhi.cnki.net/Search/MZYW402.006.html
Wu Zili [武自立]. 2004. "Gasu language [嘎僳话]". In Studies on selected languages of Yunnan [云南特殊语言研究], 486-513. Kunming: Yunnan People's Press [云南民族出版社]. 

Mondzish languages